"Four Great Women and a Manicure" is the twentieth and penultimate episode of the twentieth season of the American animated television series The Simpsons. First broadcast on the Fox network in the United States on May 10, 2009, it is the second Simpsons episode (after "Simpsons Bible Stories") to have four acts instead of the usual three. The episode tells four tales of famous women featuring Simpsons characters in various roles: Selma as Queen Elizabeth I, Lisa as Snow White, Marge as Lady Macbeth and Maggie as Howard Roark from Ayn Rand's The Fountainhead.

Jodie Foster performs the voice of Maggie Simpson. The title is a reference to the 1994 film Four Weddings and a Funeral. It is the only episode in the history of the show in which Bart Simpson is not seen nor mentioned (not counting the opening credits). It is also the second episode (after "Mona Leaves-a") to first air on Mother's Day and deal with women or mothers.

Plot
Marge takes Lisa to a salon for her first manicure, prompting a debate as to whether a woman can simultaneously be smart, powerful and beautiful.

Queen Elizabeth I
In the first tale, Marge tells the story of Queen Elizabeth I, with Selma Bouvier playing the Queen.

Various royal suitors wish to win the hand of Queen Elizabeth, including a flamboyant King 
Julio of Spain. The Queen rejects his advances and King Julio vows revenge on England, summoning the Spanish Armada. Meanwhile, Walter Raleigh, played by Homer, falls for Queen Elizabeth's Lady in Waiting, played by Marge.

When Elizabeth catches the two making out, she sentences them to execution. They are saved at the last minute when Moe dashes in, reporting the arrival of the Spanish Armada. Homer leads an English naval offense against the Armada, defeating them by accidentally setting the lone English warship on fire, which then spreads to the entire Spanish fleet. Queen Elizabeth knights him and then proclaims, "I don't need a man, for I have England" (with Moe sarcastically quipping, "Yeah, you keep telling yourself that").

Snow White
In the second tale, Lisa tells the story of Snow White, with herself in the title role.

Her version features the dwarves Crabby (Moe), Drunky (Barney), Hungry (Homer), Greedy (Mr. Burns), Lenny (Lenny), Kearney (Kearney) and Doc (Julius Hibbert), following the appearance of the Blue-Haired Lawyer who tells Lisa that Snow White and the Seven Dwarfs has been copyrighted by the Walt Disney Corporation, prompting Lisa to change the characters to avoid being sued. When the wicked queen learns from her magic high-definition television that Snow White is fairer than she is, she dispatches her huntsman (Groundskeeper Willie) to murder the young maiden. However, Willie the huntsman cannot bring himself to cut out her heart (or to cut out a pig's heart or to cut a heart out of construction paper for that matter) and Snow White runs away to the forest, seeking shelter in the dwarves' cottage. She keeps house for them while they work in the mines but the wicked queen, disguised as an old woman, physically forces Snow White to eat a poisoned apple. She escapes the dwarves, only to be brutally lynched by an angry group of woodland animals. In Lisa's version, Snow White does not need a man to wake her but is brought back to life by a female doctor.

Lady Macbeth
In the third tale, Marge relates a story of ruthless ambition, embodied by Lady Macbeth.

Marge (parodying Lady Macbeth) is frustrated with everything. Not only does she have to clean the costumes worn by the other actors, but is also criticized by the director for not doing a proper job of it. Adding to her frustrations is that Homer does not have the title role in a Springfield production of Macbeth and instead plays a tree (which he is overly pleased with as he is uninterested in auditioning for lead roles). She convinces him to murder the lead actor, Sideshow Mel. Homer follows her command and then assumes the role of Macbeth. However, his performance receives unfavorable reviews compared with the more seasoned actors and even those with no lines. After the next performance reviews, Patty and Selma points out to Marge that they agree with the reviews. They warn her that her ruthless and devious ambitions will come back to haunt her one day. Even a remorseful Homer agrees and tries in vain to convince her to have someone else be the lead role and let him go back to his original role as a tree. Furious, Marge refuses and orders a more reluctant Homer to continue his killing spree until he is the only actor left.

While scrubbing the blood from the costumes, Marge fumes over Homer screwing up and making a mess in the costumes. She is visited by the angry spirits of the actors she has murdered. She tries to put the blame on her husband, but they refuse to believe her. Sideshow Mel tells Marge off, that he and the other spirits knew that Homer was a victim himself in her devious plans. Lenny agrees and mentions that she should have listened to her sisters when she had the chance. Dr. Hibbert tells Marge that her ambitions in killing them in order for Homer to play the lead role, had done her in. Finally to take revenge for her actions, the angry spirits kill Marge by causing a fright-induced heart attack. In her memory (or rather, by her spirit force, since she apparently has not learned her lesson or anything from the experience), Homer performs a stirring soliloquy in the empty theater. Marge's ghost appears in the audience and is overjoyed by his effort. She raves that Homer has finally given a great performance for her and urges him to appear in more Shakespearean plays by tossing scripts in front of him. However much to Marge's chagrin, Homer decides to take the easy way out by killing himself so he does not have to audition any more. In his ghost form, a pleased Homer tells her off, that auditioning for those plays would be a real tragedy for him and is free to be lazy. A frustrated Marge learns her lesson the hard way when she realizes that she has to spend the rest of eternity with a lazy and happy Homer.

Maggie Roark
In the final tale, Maggie is depicted as "Maggie Roark", representing Howard Roark from Ayn Rand's The Fountainhead.

Maggie's architectural brilliance is squashed by an oppressive pre-school teacher (Ellsworth Toohey) who encourages only conformity. She builds several famous landmarks (such as The Taj Mahal in India and The Bird's Nest in Beijing, China) out of blocks and other toys, all of which are destroyed by Toohey (to the strains of Beethoven's 9th symphony, 2nd movement), who disapproves of the superiority of her creations over those of the other children. During a Parents' Day at Mediocri-Tots Day Care Center, Maggie dazzles everyone with her rendition of the Empire State Building and ends up on trial for expressing herself. During the trial, Maggie (voiced by Jodie Foster) defends herself by stating that the creative people of her time have never compromised their talent for the sake of others and neither will she. Years later, Maggie is shown as a successful architect who opens a daycare center dedicated to letting babies express themselves freely.

Ending
The rest of the story is interrupted when Marge stops Maggie from painting Vincent van Gogh's The Starry Night on the nail salon wall, scolding her for "soiling" the wall and not realizing the irony.

Reception
This episode was watched by 5.16 million viewers. It was the second most watched show of the night on Animation Domination, on the Fox network, after Family Guy.

Steve Heisler of The A.V. Club graded the episode a "C−", stating "[...] tonight's classically themed outing didn't fare very well, starting with the story of one of the Bouvier sisters as Queen Elizabeth—an episode segment that clocked in at just over four minutes, far too short a time to do anything lasting... or funny. The longest stretch came near the end, in the form of an extended riff on MacBeth [sic] involving Homer killing a ton of people. But aside from the occasional random line or two, it was pretty much a boring retelling of the tale, with Simpsons characters subbing in for Shakespearean ones. So I guess the question is: How much pleasure is there to milk from seeing familiar yellow people reenact parts of Ayn Rand's The Fountainhead? Given the show's shaky streak lately, not nearly enough."

Screen Rant listed the episode as the seventeenth worst, remarking that "...it isn't really special or memorable as it doesn't do much other than rehash stories in real-life history like Selma as Queen Elizabeth I and Lisa as Snow White."

Robert Canning of IGN gave the episode a 6.2/10, ultimately saying "Four stories instead of three, but there was really one worth watching", "Snow White".

See also

 MacHomer, a play by Rick Miller blending MacBeth and The Simpsons

References

External links 
 

The Simpsons (season 20) episodes
2009 American television episodes
Works based on Snow White
Works based on Macbeth
Cultural depictions of Elizabeth I
Television episodes set in England
Adaptations of works by Ayn Rand
Cultural depictions of Walter Raleigh
Television episodes about murder